Stenocercus puyango is a species of lizard of the Tropiduridae family. It is found in Ecuador and Peru.

References

Stenocercus
Reptiles described in 2005
Reptiles of Ecuador
Reptiles of Peru